Billal Chibani (born 15 October 1998) is a Belgian footballer who most recently played for FC Nantes B.

Personal life
Born in Belgium, Chibani is of Algerian descent.

References

Belgian Pro League players
Belgian footballers
Belgian people of Algerian descent
1998 births
Living people
Royal Excel Mouscron players
Association football midfielders
USM Alger players
Sint-Eloois-Winkel Sport players
People from Duffel
Footballers from Antwerp Province